Henry Yevele (c. 1320 – 1400) was the most prolific and successful master mason active in late medieval England. The first document relating to him is dated 3 December 1353, when he purchased the freedom of London. In February 1356 he was sufficiently well known as a mason that he was chosen as one of a commission of six cutting masons who were to inform the mayor and aldermen about the acts and articles of the craft.

Career
His first connection with royal building works was probably when he was contracted from March 1357 to September 1359 to remodel the Black Prince's manor at Kennington, at the cost of £221 4s. 7d. On 23 June 1360, he was appointed "disposer" of the royal works at the Palace of Westminster and the Tower of London. For this he was paid 1s. per day, although he continued undertaking other, non-royal, commissions.

At the Palace of Westminster, Yevele was responsible for refacing Westminster Hall, and for two essentially utilitarian buildings, the Jewel Tower in the Privy Palace (1365–6) and the clock tower (now destroyed), which stood opposite the north door of Westminster Hall and regulated the sittings of the royal courts of justice there (1366–7).

At the Tower of London, Yevele was responsible for the Bloody Tower, while several minor works, including the vaulting of the thirteenth-century watergate, were performed by Henry's brother, Robert. The real focus of activity in the king's works at this time, however, was Windsor Castle. The master mason there, John Sponlee (d. 1382?), walked in the funeral procession of Queen Philippa in 1369 as an esquire of greater estate, whereas Yevele ranked only as a lesser esquire. During Edward III's reign Yevele's strictly architectural work for the crown was, with one minor exception, confined to London, but he supplied materials to numerous royal building sites in Kent and Surrey as well as in London.

The most significant of Yevele's remaining works are the naves of Westminster Abbey (1362) and Canterbury Cathedral (1377–1400), the latter completed in an early Perpendicular Gothic style.

Yevele advised on repairs and new works at the castles of Southampton (1378–9), Carisbrooke (1380–85), Winchester (1390–1400), and Portchester (1384–5), and on the town walls of Canterbury (1385–6), but it is uncertain to what extent this involved him in major design work. In 1381, 1389, and 1393 Yevele's advice was sought by William of Wykeham, bishop of Winchester, who had been clerk of works at Windsor Castle from 1356 to 1361. On 29 August 1390 Yevele was made exempt from jury and other forms of service on account of his official duties and "great age".

Yevele's work for other lay patrons belonged to the 1370s and 1380s. For John of Gaunt he carried out in 1375 unspecified works at the Savoy Palace in London and, together with another mason, Thomas Wrek, he contracted for the duke's large and very sumptuous canopied tomb in Old St Paul's Cathedral. For John de Cobham, 3rd Baron Cobham, he furnished the design ("devyse") for a new south aisle at the London parish church of St Dunstan-in-the-East, although he did not take charge of its building. From 1368 he served as one of the two wardens of London Bridge. Although the wardenships were purely administrative, it is highly likely that he was the designer of the two-storeyed apsidal chapel of St Thomas, which projected eastwards from the middle of the bridge and which was under construction between 1384 and 1397. The chapel possessed a "table" or handboard containing a summary history of the bridge, which was the source of the statement by the 16th-century antiquary John Leland that "a mason beinge master of the bridge howse", built the chapel at his own expense. This notice can refer only to Yevele, whose name presumably meant nothing to Leland.

Death
Yevele died in 1400 and was buried at the church of St Magnus the Martyr by London Bridge. His monument was extant in John Stow's time (the late 16th century), but was probably destroyed by the Great Fire of London.

Work
Works that can be attributed to Yevele with a reasonable level of certainty include:

 Kennington Manor (part, 1358, destroyed)
 Bloody Tower of the Tower of London (1361)
 Abbot's House and College Hall, Westminster Abbey (1362)
 Nave and west cloister, Westminster Abbey (1362)
 Palace of Westminster clock tower (1365, destroyed)
 Parts of old London Bridge (destroyed)
 London Charterhouse (1371)
The high altar screen of Durham Cathedral (1372–80), shipped in boxes from London to Newcastle
 Savoy Palace (part, 1376, destroyed)
 West Gate, Canterbury (1378)
 The east and south walks of the cloister of St Albans Abbey (probably begun c.1380) (not mentioned by Harvey)
The south transept façade of Old St Paul's Cathedral (1381–8) (not mentioned by Harvey)
 Old St Dunstan-in-the-East (part, 1381, destroyed)
 Rochester bridge (1383, destroyed)
 Canterbury city walls (1385)
 Nave and south cloister of Canterbury Cathedral (1377–1400)
 Westminster Hall (1395)
The tombs of
Cardinal Simon Langham (d. 1376) in Westminster Abbey (1389)
Edward III in Westminster Abbey (after 1386)
Richard II in Westminster Abbey (1395)
Edward, the Black Prince in Canterbury Cathedral (1376)
Archbishop Simon Sudbury in Canterbury Cathedral (begun mid-1380s? Died 1381 but the tomb was created in a perpendicular style, according to the Canterbury Cathedral notes, circa 1391.)
John of Gaunt and Blanche of Lancaster (1374–80; destroyed) in the choir of Old St Paul's Cathedral.

Gallery of architectural works

References

Bibliography
 

14th-century English architects
Gothic architects
1320 births
1400 deaths